Donald Marron could refer to: 

Donald B. Marron Sr. (1934–2019), American entrepreneur and businessman
Donald B. Marron Jr., American economist and son of Donald B. Marron Sr.